Bonyunia is a genus of flowering plants belonging to the family Loganiaceae.

Its native range is Southern Tropical America.

Species:

Bonyunia antoniifolia 
Bonyunia aquatica 
Bonyunia excelsa 
Bonyunia magnifica 
Bonyunia minor 
Bonyunia nobilis 
Bonyunia pulchra 
Bonyunia spectabilis 
Bonyunia superba 
Bonyunia venusta

References

Loganiaceae
Gentianales genera